Joyes may refer to:

 Joyes (department store), a business in Grays, Essex from 1900 to 1975
 Inés Joyes y Blake (1731–1808), Spanish translator and writer
 John Joyes (1799–1877), Kentucky lawyer and politician
 Richard Joyes, Australian recipient of the Cross of Valour

See also
 Joy (disambiguation)
 Joye